Nobody's Heroes is the second album by Irish punk rock band Stiff Little Fingers, released in 1980.

"Doesn't Make It All Right" is a cover of a song from the Specials' debut album, Specials.

Track listing 
All tracks composed by Fingers and Gordon Ogilvie; except where noted.
"Gotta Gettaway" – 3:37
"Wait and See" (Jake Burns, Gordon Ogilvie) – 4:28
"Fly the Flag" – 3:46
"At the Edge" (Fingers) – 2:59
"Nobody's Hero" (Jake Burns, Gordon Ogilvie) – 4:11
"Bloody Dub" (Fingers) – 3:47
"Doesn't Make It All Right" (Dave Goldberg, Jerry Dammers, Mark Harrison) – 5:50
"I Don't Like You" – 2:44
"No Change" – 1:56
"Tin Soldiers" – 4:46

The 2001 EMI CD reissue added the following tracks:

The reissue also includes the second part of an interview of Jake Burns by Alan Parker (the first part is included in the reissue of Inflammable Material).

Charts

Personnel 
Stiff Little Fingers
Jake Burns – vocals, guitar
Jim Reilly – drums
Henry Cluney – guitar, backing vocals
Ali McMordie – bass
Technical
Doug Bennett – producer
Laurence Burrage – engineer
Nigel Brooke-Harte – engineer
Andi Banks – tour manager
Shaun Bradley – equipment
Agency – cowbell
Geoff Halpin – cover lettering
Brian Cooke – photography
Chris Gabrin – photography
Mats Lundgren – photography
Barry Plummer – photography

References 

1980 albums
Stiff Little Fingers albums
Chrysalis Records albums
albums recorded at Olympic Sound Studios